Bacchisa cyanicollis is a species of beetle in the family Cerambycidae. It was described by Breuning in 1956. It is known from Borneo.

References

C
Beetles described in 1956